Repeat – The Best of Jethro Tull – Vol II is a 1977 greatest hits album from Jethro Tull, featuring one track which, up to the time of this album's release, had not been issued. The album's first volume was M.U. – The Best of Jethro Tull.

Track listing

Notes
 "Thick as a Brick (Edit #4)" consists of the section of Part I beginning with "I've come down from the upper class..." on the original album (1972).
 "A Passion Play (Edit #9)" consists of the segment identified as "Flight from Lucifer" on a March 1998 Mobile Fidelity Sound Lab gold CD issue of 1973's A Passion Play - this begins at 16:58 in Part II of the current CD issue.
 "Glory Row" is now available as a bonus track on the remastered version of War Child (1974).
 "Glory Row" had been previously made available in the Spanish LP edition of Aqualung (1971) (which was not released until 1975) in place of "Locomotive Breath", which was already available in Living in the Past (1972).

Charts

Personnel
 Ian Anderson – vocals, flute, mandolin, acoustic guitar, guitar, soprano & alto saxophone, voices, producer
 Martin Barre – acoustic guitar, electric guitar
 John Evan – accordion, piano, synthesizer, piano-accordion, Hammond organ, keyboards on 1, 2, 5-10
 Glenn Cornick – bass guitar on tracks 3, 4, 8
 Jeffrey Hammond – bass guitar on tracks 1, 2, 5–7, 10
 John Glascock – bass guitar; vocals on track 9
 Clive Bunker – drums, percussion on tracks 2–4, 8
 Barriemore Barlow – drums, percussion on tracks 1, 5–7, 9, 10
 Dee Palmer – arranger, saxophone, synthesizer, keyboards, conductor
 Maddy Prior – backing vocals on 9

Recording personnel
 Terry Ellis – producer
 John Burns – engineer
 Andy Johns – engineer
 Robin Black – engineer
 Frank Duarte – illustrations

Notes 
 Also known as Repeat: The Best of Jethro Tull, Vol. 2 or Repeat: The Best of Jethro Tull - Vol II

References

External links 
 Jethro Tull - Repeat - The Best of Jethro Tull - Vol II (1977) album review by Dave Connolly, credits & releases at AllMusic.com
 Jethro Tull - Repeat - The Best of Jethro Tull - Vol II (1977) album releases & credits at Discogs.com
 Jethro Tull - Repeat - The Best of Jethro Tull - Vol II (1977) album to be listened as stream at Play.Spotify.com

1977 greatest hits albums
Jethro Tull (band) compilation albums
Chrysalis Records compilation albums